Shahrud Kola (also Romanized as Shahrūd Kolā) is a village in Aliabad Rural District, in the Central District of Qaem Shahr County, Mazandaran Province, Iran. At the 2006 census, its population was 959, in 248 families.

References 

Populated places in Qaem Shahr County